The Royal Astronomical Society of Canada (RASC) is a national, non-profit, charitable organization devoted to the advancement of astronomy and related sciences. At present, there are 30 local branches of the Society, called Centres, in towns and cities across the country from St. John's, Newfoundland, to Victoria, British Columbia, and as far north as Whitehorse, Yukon.  There are about 5100 members from coast to coast to coast, and internationally. The membership is composed primarily of amateur astronomers and also includes numerous professional astronomers and astronomy educators.  The RASC is the Canadian equivalent of the British Astronomical Association.

History
The RASC has its original roots in Toronto, Ontario, Canada, where in 1868 a group of friends began meeting as part of the "Toronto Astronomical Club." The club was formally incorporated as "The Astronomical and Physical Society of Toronto" in 1890, and this is considered the founding date of the Society. The club grew over time, and by 1900, surrounding communities were affiliated with the group.  On 1903 March 3, the club was renamed to "The Royal Astronomical Society of Canada" after petitioning King Edward VII to use the prefix "Royal" in the group's name. At the time it had 120 members. In the more than a century since its formal incorporation, the RASC has expanded across Canada with Centres in 30 cities, reaching every province of Canada with the exception of Prince Edward Island.

Organization

Mandate
The RASC mandate is five-fold:
 to stimulate interest and to promote and increase knowledge in astronomy and related sciences;
 to acquire and maintain equipment, libraries, and other property necessary for the pursuit of its aims;
 to publish journals, books, and other material containing information on the progress of astronomy and the work of the Society;
 to receive and administer gifts, donations, and bequests from members of the Society and others;
 to make contributions and render assistance to individuals and institutions engaged in the study and advancement of astronomy.

Society Office
The Society Office in Toronto employs three staff.

Board of Directors
President (1-year term)
1st Vice-President (1-year term, Chair of Publications Committee and Chair of Constitution Committee)
2nd Vice-President (1-year term, Chair of Nominating Committee)
Treasurer (1-year term, Chair of Finance Committee)
National Secretary (1-year term)
Up to four (4) Directors
Executive Director (Appointed - non-voting)

National Council

Centre Representatives
At least one representative from each Centre, plus two Unattached Member reps
Past Presidents
Immediate Past President
Editors
Observer's Handbook Editor (5-year term)
Journal Editor (5-year term)
Observer's Calendar Editor (5-year term)
Bulletin Editor (5-year term)

Staff (Non-voting)
Finance Officer
Permanent Committees (Chairs)
Astroimaging
Awards (Past President)
Constitution (1st Vice-President)
Education and Public Outreach
Finance (Treasurer)
Fundraising
History
Information Technology
Light-Pollution Abatement
Membership and Development
Nominating (2nd Vice-President)
Observing
Publications (1st Vice-President)

Conduct of Business
The RASC conducts business through a Board of Directors with regular meetings, plus two scheduled meetings at the General Assembly, which is traditionally held on the May or July long weekend (GA).  The GA is hosted by one of the Centres, with annual meetings alternating between eastern and western Canada.  Meetings follow Robert's Rules of Order and are governed by the By-Laws of the Society.

Members of Note
The RASC has many prestigious and well-known members.  Some are well known for their accomplishments, and others for their recognition with the Order of Canada.

Current Honorary President Dr. Doug Hube (2018–2022)

Dr. Hube joined the RASC as a student in 1960 and has been active member ever since. He has served as President of the Edmonton Centre and was Society President from 1992 to 1994. He won the RASC Service Award in 1982.
He grew up in St. Catharines, Ontario, and studied astronomy at the University of Toronto, where he met his wife Joan.
Since joining the faculty at the University of Alberta in 1969, Dr. Hube has mentored generations of astronomy students and RASC members. He also has a strong record as a researcher, administrator and promoter of astronomy. He has written many articles in RASC publications and scientific journals. Doug and Joan Hube continue to take active part in RASC activities, including the recent General Assembly in Calgary.
Dr. Hube succeeds Dr. John Percy of Toronto as Honorary President, and his term runs for four years until the GA in 2022.

Centres
Each of the Centres of the Society conduct a variety of activities of interest to its members and to the public. At regular meetings, well-known professional and amateur astronomers give lectures on a variety of topics of current interest. In addition, there are study and special-interest groups. Most Centres publish their own newsletters and hold their own group-observing events. Some members take part in regular observations of variable stars, lunar occultations, sunspots, meteors, comets, and other phenomena; others develop special skills such as astroimaging at workshops.

Outreach
Most Centres have public education programs, including special outreach star nights when the public is given an opportunity to look through a telescope courtesy of a RASC volunteer.  In 2009, the International Year of Astronomy, many Centres were instrumental in organizing events of educational astronomy outreach for their local communities. The RASC's Light-Pollution Abatement Committee also administers Canada's Dark-sky preserve program, working with provincial and national parks to create management agreements to preserve the darkness of the nighttime sky.

Resources
Many Centres have observing equipment, libraries, and observing locations.  For example, the Victoria Centre has telescopes and a large library of books and periodicals available to members in good standing.  Additionally the Victoria Centre built and operates the "RASC Victoria Centre Observatory (RASC VCO)" which is located at the Dominion Astrophysical Observatory. The Society has recently purchased a robotic telescope.

Publications and awards
The RASC publishes a number of books and periodicals, and issues awards to recognize accomplishments in astronomy and outreach activities.

Recurring Publications
The annual Observer's Handbook can be found in observatory control rooms and astronomers' reference shelves worldwide. Published in the autumn of the year, the 352-page Handbook contains detailed information on astronomical events in the upcoming year and is an in-depth reference of significant astronomical data such as observing techniques, physical constants, and optical properties of telescopes.  The first two editions were published in 1907 and 1908, respectively. For the following two years information from the Observer's Handbook was integrated into the main Journal, but it was decided eventually that the Handbook return to circulation. The 3rd edition of the Observer's Handbook was published in January 1911, with Editor C. A. Chant aiming to publish the 1912 edition in the autumn of that year. The 110th edition was published in 2017, covering events in 2018. In addition, for the first time, a USA Edition was created for the American audience, in cooperation with the Astronomical League. The publication is currently in its 113th edition published in 2020, covering the events of 2021.

The Journal of the Royal Astronomical Society of Canada (ISSN 0035-872X) (bib. code - JRASC), continuously published since 1907, is a bi-monthly periodical that features articles about Canadian astronomers, activities of the RASC and its Centres, and peer-reviewed research papers.

The Observer's Calendar features photos of an astronomical subject taken by amateur astronomers using CCD and other camera equipment on amateur instruments.  Each photograph is given an informative caption along with comprehensive astronomical data for dates throughout each month.

Explore the Universe Guide; An Introduction to the RASC ETU Certificate Program is a book for the casual backyard astronomer who is thinking about getting serious.

See also

Société d'astronomie de Montréal
List of astronomical societies

References

External links 

Links to individual RASC Centres' Web sites.
Archival papers of Frank Scott Hogg, president and assistant editor, held at the University of Toronto Archives and Records Management Services
Archival papers of Ruth Josephine Northcott, first female chair (1942–1943) and editor (1956–1969), held at the University of Toronto Archives and Records Management Services

Astronomy organizations
Astronomy societies
Amateur astronomy organizations
Higher education in Canada
Scientific organizations based in Canada
Professional associations based in Canada
Organizations based in Canada with royal patronage
Scientific organizations established in 1868
Astronomy in Canada
1868 establishments in Ontario